The canton of Briançon-Sud is a former administrative division in southeastern France. It was disbanded following the French canton reorganisation which came into effect in March 2015. It had 10,572 inhabitants (2012).

The canton comprised the following communes:
Briançon (partly)
Cervières
Puy-Saint-André
Puy-Saint-Pierre
Villar-Saint-Pancrace

Demographics

See also
Cantons of the Hautes-Alpes department

References

Former cantons of Hautes-Alpes
2015 disestablishments in France
States and territories disestablished in 2015